In enzymology, a mycothione reductase is an enzyme that catalyzes the chemical reaction

mycothione + NAD(P)H + H +  2 mycothiol + NADP+

in M. tuberculosis and other actinomycetes.

The 2 substrates of this enzyme are mycothiol and NADPH, whereas 2 molecules of mycothione and NADP+ are formed as products.

This enzyme belongs to the family of oxidoreductases, specifically those acting on a sulfur group of donors with NAD+ or NADP+ as acceptor.  The systematic name of this enzyme class is mycothiol:NAD(P)+ oxidoreductase. This enzyme is also called mycothiol-disulfide reductase.

References

 
 

EC 1.8.1
NADPH-dependent enzymes
NADH-dependent enzymes
Enzymes of unknown structure